Politiets Aktionsstyrke (AKS, English: The Special Intervention Unit) is the police tactical unit of the Danish National Police. It is meant to handle extraordinarily difficult or life-threatening criminal situations, such as terrorism, hostage situations, and kidnapping. It also deals with emergency rescue situations that would be too dangerous for others to handle. The AKS holds responsibility for all anti-terror and counter-terrorism missions in Denmark. It is known that AKS cross-trains with the army and navy elite-units Jægerkorpset and Frømandskorpset.
Their training includes: tactical shooting, hand-to-hand combat, surveillance, and explosives. Policemen who want to join the unit are required to take and pass selection tests.

Duties
 Counter sniper operation.
 Forced entry operations.
 Apprehension of armed suspects.
 Apprehension of barricaded suspects.
 Force protection during deployment.
 Handling hostage situations.
 Close protection.

History
The unit's operational functions are closely guarded secrets, so not much is known. What has been published is that the unit was created just after the Munich Summer Olympic incident in 1972.

In 1998 the unit was re-organized to include a permanent force of roughly 100 police officers; it previously "borrowed" officers from regular units on an as needed basis.

AKS led the operation of clearing and evicting the anarchist and leftist groups from Ungdomshuset on March 1, 2007.

Its activities are under the jurisdiction of the Danish Security and Intelligence Service (PET).

An officer from AKS was seriously wounded on January 7, 2013, during an arrest operation against three suspected narcotics smugglers. The suspected perpetrator was killed by a headshot and another man was wounded. A third man was arrested. It was the first time that an AKS-officer had been wounded during an operation.

Equipment
MP5
USP Compact
C8 rifle
G36c
Sako TRG
SIG MCX

References

External links
 

Non-military counterterrorist organizations
Specialist law enforcement agencies of Denmark
ATLAS Network